Kurushabad (also Romanized as Kūrūshābād; also known as Darvīshābād and Dervishova) is a village in Oshnavieh-ye Shomali Rural District, in the Central District of Oshnavieh County, West Azerbaijan Province, Iran. At the 2006 census, its population was 255, in 45 families.

References 

Populated places in Oshnavieh County